Mohammed Ben Ali Abgali FRS was a Moroccan Ambassador to Great Britain, from 14 August 1725 to February 1727.

He was elected Fellow of the Royal Society in 1727.
He corresponded with Martin Folkes.

References

Moroccan diplomats
Fellows of the Royal Society
Year of birth unknown
Year of death unknown
Ambassadors of Morocco to Great Britain
18th-century Moroccan people